That's My Daddy is a 1928 American silent comedy starring Reginald Denny and Barbara Kent. The film's story is credited to Denny; though the direction is credited to Fred C. Newmeyer, Denny claimed to have directed most of the film himself. The film survives and has been preserved by the UCLA Film and Television Archive.

Preservation
After being unavailable to the public for many decades, the film was screened at the Stanford Theatre in Palo Alto, California, on August 24, 2007 (on a double bill with Denny's 1925 film I'll Show You the Town), and again on August 13, 2014. In both cases, the films were introduced and accompanied by the organist Dennis James.

References

External links
 
 

1928 films
1928 comedy films
Silent American comedy films
American silent feature films
American black-and-white films
Films about orphans
Films directed by Fred C. Newmeyer
Universal Pictures films
1920s English-language films
1920s American films